Zareabad (also Romanized as Zāre‘ābād; also known as Ja‘farābād) is a village in Gamasiyab Rural District, in the Central District of Nahavand County, Hamadan Province, Iran. At the 2006 census, its population was 581, in 159 families.

References 

Populated places in Nahavand County